Coining may refer to:
Coining (metalworking), metalworking process
Solder ball flattening
Coining (mint), production of money 
Counterfeiting of coins
The creation of a protologism or neologism
Coining (traditional medicine), dermabrasion practiced in China, Vietnam, and Indonesia

See also 
 Coin (disambiguation)
 Coinage (disambiguation)